Charles Ludwig de Blume or Karl Ludwig von Blume (9 June 1796, Braunschweig – 3 February 1862, Leiden) was a German-Dutch botanist. 

He was born at Braunschweig in Germany, but studied at Leiden University and spent his professional life working in the Dutch East Indies and in the Netherlands, where he was Director of the Rijksherbarium (state herbarium) at Leiden. His name is sometimes given in the Dutch language form Karel Lodewijk Blume, but the original German spelling is the one most widely used in botanical texts: even then there is confusion, as he is sometimes referred to as K.L. Blume (from Karl).

He carried out extensive studies of the flora of southern Asia, particularly in Java, then a colony of the Netherlands. From 1823 to 1826 Blume was Deputy Director of Agriculture at the botanic garden in Bogor (Buitenzorg) in Java. In 1827 he became correspondent of the Royal Institute of the Netherlands. In 1855, he was elected a foreign member of the Royal Swedish Academy of Sciences.

He planned, together with Philipp Franz von Siebold (1796–1866), the foundation of the "Koninklijke Nederlandsche Maatschappij tot aanmoediging van den Tuinbouw". (Royal Dutch Society for the Advancement of Horticulture). This was carried to fruition in 1842.

The botanical journal Blumea is named after him. 

He was also an entomologist.

Publications 
Carl Ludwig Blume: "Catalogus van eenige der merkwaardigste zoo in- als uitheemse gewassen, te vinden in 's Lands Plantentuin te Buitenzorg" opgemaakt door C. L. Blume, M.D., Directeur van voorz. tuin. s.l. n.d. [Batavia 1823]. (Catalogue of some native and exotic plants in Buitenzorg)
 Carl Ludwig Blume: Bijdragen tot de flora van Nederlandsch Indië .... 1825–1827 (Contributions to the flora of the Dutch Indies) on Botanicus
 
 Carl Ludwig Blume & Johannes B. Fischer (? – 1832): Flora Javae nec non insularum adjacentium .... 1828–1851.
 Carl Ludwig Blume: De novis quibusdam plantarum familiis expositio et olim jam expositarum enumeratio. (1833)
 Carl Ludwig Blume: Rumphia, sive commentationes botanicae imprimis de plantis Indiae orientalis .... 1835–1849 (4 volumes with 170 illustrations)
 Carl Ludwig Blume: Museum botanicum Lugduno-Batavum .... 1849–1857 on Botanicus
 Carl Ludwig Blume: Flora Javae et insularum adjacentium nova series (1858–1859)
 Carl Ludwig Blume: Collection des Orchidées les plus remarquables de l'Archipel Indien et du Japon (1858–1859).

References

External links 
 
 Detailed biography
 Karl Ludwig Blume Karl Ludwig Blume's work on orchids

1789 births
1862 deaths
Botanists with author abbreviations
Bryologists
Pteridologists
Dutch entomologists
German entomologists
Dutch mycologists
German mycologists
Members of the Royal Netherlands Academy of Arts and Sciences
Members of the Royal Swedish Academy of Sciences
Leiden University alumni
German emigrants to the Netherlands
Scientists from Braunschweig
People from the Duchy of Brunswick
People from Leiden
19th-century Dutch botanists
19th-century German botanists